is the third and final live album by Japanese dub band Fishmans. It documents the band's final live performance with frontman Shinji Sato. The show was recorded and filmed at Akasaka Blitz on December 28, 1998, and was first released on September 29, 1999, by Polydor Records in Japan. The album title roughly translates to "A Farewell of Men: December 28th, 1998", a reference to the tour name, and to bassist Yuzuru Kashiwabara's departure from the band and the end of the band's three-piece era. The performance was released on DVD under the name Otokotachi no Wakare 98.12.28 @ Akasaka Blitz (男達の別れ 98.12.28 @赤坂Blitz) in 2005.

Background 
On December 28, 1998, the last day of the Otokotachi no Wakare tour, Fishmans would perform their final concert at Akasaka Blitz. While initially intended as a farewell to bassist Yuzuru Kashiwabara, who was departing from the band, it ultimately served as a farewell to frontman Shinji Sato and to Fishmans as a whole, as Sato suddenly died within months, more or less ending the band as they did not release any new music and only performed reunion shows from then on.

Performance
Fishmans performed a multitude of their most beloved songs and singles, including "Hikōki", "Ikareta Baby", "Night Cruising", "Melody", "Walking in the Rhythm", and "Yurameki in the Air". As a finale, they played an extended adaptation of the entirety of their sixth studio album Long Season. The concert encapsulated the band's progression stylistically from music heavily influenced by reggae and dub, to dream pop and neo-psychedelia at the end of their career.

Reception 

In a review for The Michigan Daily, Sayan Ghosh wrote the album is "a triumph", specifically praising Sato's powerful and passionate voice and the embellishments on "Long Season" that "add new dimensions to the music".

Track listing

Personnel
Fishmans
 Shinji Sato – vocals, guitar
 Yuzuru Kashiwabara – bass guitar, chorus
 Kin-ichi Motegi – guitar, drums, chorus, sampler

Supporting guest musicians
 Honzi – keyboards, violin, chorus
 Michio "Darts" Sekiguchi – guitar, chorus

Technical personnel

 ZAK (recording, mixer)
 午前中 (stage producer)
 Hiroto Sasaki (stage director)
 Shige Sasaki (stage director)
 Ichizo Nishikawa (sound engineer)
 Katsuhiko Kamimura (monitor engineer)
 Yoji Joko (instrument technician)
 Tomoyuki Abe (instrument technician)
 Kenji Fujii (instrument technician)
 Makoto Nagahama (instrument technician)
 Kazuhiro Hirayama (lighting designer)
 Masato Kihara (concert promoter)
 Yuka Koizumi (mastering)
 Mariko Miyashita (mobile recording crew)
 Yujiro Saito (mobile recording crew)
 Michinori Sato (mobile recording crew)
 Kouta Kiryu (mobile recording crew)
 Takahisa Ishida (mobile recording crew)
 Toshiya Sano (A&R)
 Masaki Morimoto (A&R)
 Naoto Yoshida (promotional planner)
 Kyoko Teradate (marketing promotion)
 Akiko Ueta (artist manager)
 Moog Yamamoto (art direction, design)
 Mariko Yamamoto (art direction, design)
 Phonic (art direction, design)
 Gen Inaba (photography)
 Kensuke Kawamura (video cameraman)
 Hiroyuki Howa (video cameraman)
 Takuro Iwagami (video cameraman)
 Kazuhiko Tanaka (video cameraman)
 Chiaki Momose (video cameraman)
 Yoshiaki Uchiyama (video cameraman)
 Yumi Haga (visual coordination)
 Ichiro Asatsuma (executive producer)
 Yoshiyuki Okuda (executive producer)
 Ikuzo Orita (executive producer)
 Susumu Machida (supervisor)
 Akira Watanabe (supervisor)

References

Live albums by Japanese artists
1999 live albums
Fishmans albums
Albums recorded at Akasaka Blitz